Anna K. Williams (born 1980) is an American politician. She is a Democrat representing the 52nd district in the Oregon House of Representatives.

Biography

Anna Williams was born in 1980 in Wyoming. She attended the University of Kansas, where she earned a BS in Psychology in 2002 and a master's degree in Social Welfare Administration in 2005. In 2009, she moved to Hood River, Oregon in 2009, where she lives with her husband and two sons. She works remotely for Simmons University as an adjunct professor and academic advisor.

Political career

In 2018, Williams ran for the District 52 seat in the Oregon House of Representatives. She won the Democratic primary with 76.9% of the vote, and defeated Republican incumbent Jeff Helfrich in the general election with 51.4% of the vote. She was sworn in on January 14, 2019.

Williams currently sits on the following House committees:
 Interim Committee on Human Services and Housing (Vice-Chair)
 Interim Committee on Agriculture and Land Use

Williams is running for re-election in 2020. Jeff Helfrich has filed to run again for his former seat.

Electoral record

References

External links
 Official Oregon State Legislature website
 Campaign website

Living people
Democratic Party members of the Oregon House of Representatives
1980 births